Reinhard Meier (11 March 1946 – 25 November 2020) was a German football player. He spent eight seasons in the Bundesliga with 1. FC Kaiserslautern.

References

Honours
 DFB-Pokal finalist: 1975–76, 1980–81
 Bundesliga 3rd place: 1978–79, 1979–80

External links
 

1946 births
2020 deaths
German footballers
1. FC Kaiserslautern players
Bundesliga players
Sportspeople from Wiesbaden
Association football defenders
Footballers from Hesse
SV Alsenborn players